John Ryan (born 1 May 1950) is an entrepreneur involved in the cosmetic surgery business in the United Kingdom and the former chairman of his hometown club Doncaster Rovers, which he has supported since being a boy.

After expanding a cosmetic surgery company, which he sold in 2002, he created his own MYA (Make Yourself Amazing) line of surgical clinics in 2007. Ryan has written an autobiography, Dare To Dream, which has been on sale since February 2010.

Ryan entered The Guinness Book of Records as the oldest footballer to appear for a professional British club when he came on as a substitute in the 89th minute for Doncaster Rovers against Hereford United in a Conference National match on 26 April 2003, at the age of 52 years and 11 months. He was allocated the number 28.

References

External links
John Ryan football profile at doncasterrovers.co.uk
John Ryan article on Supporters Group site

1950 births
Living people
People from Doncaster
English footballers
Association football forwards
Doncaster Rovers F.C. players
National League (English football) players
English football chairmen and investors